Nepalicius koreanus is a jumping spider that lives in China, Japan and Korea. The species was previously allocated to the genus Pseudicius.

References

Salticidae
Spiders of Asia
Spiders of China
Chelicerates of Japan
Arthropods of Korea
Spiders described in 1981
Taxa named by Wanda Wesołowska